Words with the Shaman is a three-part instrumental suite by the English singer-songwriter David Sylvian. It was recorded in London in 1985 and released as an EP the same year on Virgin Records. It peaked at #72 in the UK single charts.

As Sylvian described in a liner note, Words with the Shaman was "conceived as musical footnotes of themes started earlier on the album Brilliant Trees and [...] developed as a collaborative group effort."
 
Words with the Shaman was subsequently re-released  with two additional instrumental tracks on Sylvian's compilation album, first only released on cassette Alchemy: An Index of Possibilities. In 1989, the suite appeared on the second of four CDs in the Weatherbox set. The 1991 US-reissue of Sylvian's Brilliant Trees album also contained Words with the Shaman.

Track listing 
 "Pt. 1 Ancient Evening" (Sylvian/Hassell) 5:14
 "Pt. 2 Incantation" (Sylvian/Hassell) 3:31
 "Pt. 3 Awakening (Songs from the Tree Tops)" (Sylvian/Hassell/Jansen) 5:19

Personnel 
 David Sylvian – keyboards, guitar, tapes
 Steve Jansen – drums, percussion, additional keyboards
 Jon Hassell – trumpet
 Holger Czukay – radio
 Percy Jones – fretless bass

References

1985 singles
David Sylvian songs
Songs written by David Sylvian
Songs written by Jon Hassell
1985 songs
Virgin Records singles